Choi Whee-sung (born February 5, 1982), known professionally as Wheesung or by the stage name Realslow, is a South Korean R&B singer, record producer, and musical theatre actor.

Career

1982: Early life and education
Wheesung was born on February 5, 1982. He was an avid dancer in high school, where he was part of a rock band. He began singing in his senior year.

He initially attended the Sun Moon University, under the journalism major but dropped out. Wheesung subsequently attended the Gukje Digital University and Kyung Hee University's Graduate School of Communication.

1997–1999: Dance Team and Group Debut
He started his career in 1997 as a member of a back dancing team ING. Wheesung began his career in 1999 with the short lived Korean boy group, A4. He left after the band's first album debut, citing musical differences between himself and the other members of the band. After that, He joined a rock band, MAME, as vocalist for a short while. And, he participated the MBC College Music Festival (MBC 강변가요제) in 2000.

2000–2006: Solo Debut and YG Entertainment
In 2000, he signed onto M Boat, a former sister company to YG Entertainment. He underwent a few years of vocal training under the label and released his first solo album Like A Movie in 2002. The album became very popular after receiving praise from many well-known artists, including Seo Taiji and Shin Seung Hun. In 2003, he released his second album, It's Real. It proved to be as popular as his first, making him the best selling artist of 2003 in Korea. Unlike his debut album, It's Real wasn't restricted to R&B and it included different musical elements like pop and hip-hop.

2006–2009: Orange Shock Agency
Wheesung left YG Entertainment after his contract expired in March 2006. He signed a new contract that is reportedly worth 1.5 million won with his new company Orange Shock Agency.

Wheesung has collaborated with many artists. In late 2008, Wheesung has collaborated once again with Lee Hyori who featured as his girlfriend in his music video of "별이 지다.." (Fading Star) in the "With All My Heart and Soul" album. In 2009, Wheesung seeks help from producer Lee Hyun-do, they will collaborate to produce the new album which the release date has been set in August 2009.

2009–2011: POP/UP Entertainment
In April 2009, Wheesung is the MC/host of a new Mnet TV show called "Pre Star-1 Show. This show gives opportunities for new talented singers to introduce themselves, a platform for them to reach out to more fans. Every month about nine or ten teams will be introduced on Mnet.com and the team which receives most response from the netizens will be chosen onto the show. The chosen team/singer will also be given the chance to perform with popular stars. Wheesung's Pre-Show 1 Show’ started airing on April 24 on Mnet Cable Channel.

Wheesung had participated in several Kpop concerts in Los Angeles, California, which include the Hollywood Bowl, and the Victory Concert. On June 19, 2009, Wheesung and Lena Park held a concert in Los Angeles Disney Concert Hall. After the concert, Wheesung planned to stay in Los Angeles for a month to work on his new album with producer Lee Hyun-do. The new album will go back to the r&b/hiphop style similar to "With Me" and "Incurable Disease". The new album is set to be released in August 2009. Wheesung also claimed in an interview that he wants to visit Pink's Hot Dogs while in LA. On June 27 and July 4, Wheesung performed at "Insomnia Concert" and club Le Cercle in LA. On July 11, he performed at the HALO nightclub in Hollywood.

In June 2009, Wheesung changed his label again from Orange Shock to POP/UP Entertainment, which houses stars like JK Kim Dong Wook and group M to M. Wheesung has decided to change his label because former producer, Park Gun Tae, concentrated more on producing and working by himself. Wheesung gave thanks to Park Gun Tae for his growth as an artist and hopes to learn from him as a little brother, no longer as an artist under a producer.

2011–2016: YMC Entertainment and Military service
In 2011, he transferred to Tae Jin Ah's YMC Entertainment. Soon after joining YMC Entertainment, he recruited female singer Ailee. On November 7, 2011, he enlisted for mandatory military service. He served 21 months of active service after completing five-week of basic training course at a boot camp in Nonsan, South Chungcheong Province.

On July 11, 2012, Wheesung was granted a 9 nights, 10 days temporary leave from the army to undergo surgery for a herniated disc as well as other medical conditions such as bilateral shoulders dislocation, psoriasis and alopecia.

August 9, 2013, Wheesung was discharged from the military.

2017–present: Realslow Company and new stage name
In 2017, Wheesung parted ways with YMC Entertainment after his contract with the agency came to an end. He set up an independent label called Realslow Company, and he will now be promoting under the stage name Realslow.

Realslow is a stage name used by Wheesung when he was an underground singer. Wheesung gained attention in the early 2000s as an underground musician before he debuted in 2002. The name references his love and passion for R&B music, which still struggles to have much popularity in Korea. Through this new name and label, Wheesung aims to return to his roots and produce some soulful R&B music.

Discography

Studio albums
 Like a Movie (2002)
 It's Real (2003)
 For the Moment (2004)
 Love... Love...? Love...! (2005)
 Eternal Essence of Music (2007)
 Vocolate (2009)

Mini albums
 With All My Heart and Soul (2008)
 They Are Coming (2011)
 The Best Man (2014)
 Transformation (2016)
 In Space (2018)

Lyrics and compositions

Filmography

Musical 
 2014: Zorro as Zorro
 2016: All Shook Up as Elvis
 2017–2018: All Shook Up as Elvis

Variety shows
 2009: Mnet & tvN, Wheesung's Pre Star 1Show, MC
 2017–2018: tvN, My English Puberty, (나의영어 사춘기), E1-E8
 2018: Channel A, Galaxy, (우주를줄게), E1-10
 2018: Mnet & tvN, The Call , E1-5、8
 2018: tvN, A Battle of One Voice: 300, (하나의 목소리 전쟁: 300), E3、5
 2018: MBC plus, New Music God (창작의신)
 2018: TV Chosun, Neighbour Album (동네앨범)

Concert

Awards and nominations

References

External links
 

1982 births
English-language singers from South Korea
Korean Music Award winners
Living people
MAMA Award winners
Soul-jazz vocalists
South Korean male musical theatre actors
South Korean male singers
South Korean pop singers
South Korean record producers
South Korean rhythm and blues singers
South Korean singer-songwriters
Singers from Seoul
Male jazz musicians
South Korean male singer-songwriters